Franz Scherübl (born 23 November 1940) is an Austrian former skier. He competed in the Nordic combined event at the 1964 Winter Olympics.

References

External links
 

1940 births
Living people
Austrian male Nordic combined skiers
Olympic Nordic combined skiers of Austria
Nordic combined skiers at the 1964 Winter Olympics
People from Radstadt
Sportspeople from Salzburg (state)